Vipin Patwa is a music director, singer and composer who composes music for Hindi Movies, particularly for Bollywood.

Early life
Vipin Patwa was born in Uttar Pradesh, India to a business family and was brought up in New Delhi. He was a very musical child and would always listen to the different genres of Indian music. He would practise ragas of Hindustani music at the age of 14. His music tutelage was under Pandit Harish Tiwari of the Kirana gharana. Vipin went on to complete his graduate and post-graduate studies in Indian classical music and also secured his masters (MPhil) degree in music from Delhi University. Along with this, he also finished his six-year course "Sangeet Prabhakar" which is a prestigious music qualification.

Career
While he was completing his bachelor, in 2002, he joined All India Radio as a music composer and began composing jingles and songs for the radio station. In January 2009, he moved to Mumbai which is the entertainment capital of India with Bollywood. Vipin got his first break with Joe Rajan's Luv U Soniyo. He recorded songs with renowned Bollywood singers like Sonu Nigam, Neha Kakkar, Arijit Singh, Atif Aslam, Mika, KK, Shaan, Shreya Ghoshal, Sunidhi Chauhan and many more. Vipin Patwa was also a voice actor in the movie (released in 2012). 
Sonu Nigam, one of the Bollywood singers has praised Vipin as a composer as well as a singer. Nigam also called him "Vilakshan". 
Many renowned celebs have also praised Vipin's compositions.

Discography
 Code Name tiranga
Nikamma
 Bhuj: The Pride of India
 The Girl On The Train 
 De De Pyaar De
 Firkee
 Hum Chaar
 Daas Dev
 Kaashi in Search of Ganga
 Rambhajjan Zindabaad
 Laali Ki Shaadi Mein Laaddoo Deewana
 Wah Taj
 Bollywood Diaries
 Laal Rang
 Main Aur Charles
 Ye Stupid Pyaar

Filmography as composer

References

External links 
 Official Website

Indian film score composers
1982 births
Living people
People from Gorakhpur
Indian male composers
Bollywood playback singers